The 1961 Brisbane Rugby League season was the 53rd season of the Brisbane Rugby League premiership. Eight teams from across Brisbane competed for the premiership, which culminated in a third straight grand final matchup between Northern Suburbs and Fortitude Valley. Norths won 29-5 to claim their third consecutive premiership.

Ladder

Finals 

Source:

References 

1961 in rugby league
1961 in Australian rugby league
Rugby league in Brisbane